Doncaster railway station is on the East Coast Main Line in England, serving the city of Doncaster, South Yorkshire. It is managed by London North Eastern Railway.

It is a major passenger interchange between the main line, Cross Country Route and local services running across the North of England. It is also the point for which London North Eastern Railway services branching off to  diverge from the main route continuing north towards Edinburgh.

History
The railway station was built in 1849 replacing a temporary structure constructed a year earlier. It was rebuilt in its present form in 1938 and has had several slight modifications since that date, most notably in 2006, when the new interchange and connection to Frenchgate Centre opened.

In May 2015, construction commenced on a new Platform 0 to the north-east of the station adjacent to the Frenchgate Centre on the site of the former cattle dock. It is used by terminating Northern Trains services to Hull, Beverley, Bridlington and Scarborough. This allowed these services to operate independently of the East Coast Main Line. It is joined to the rest of the station via a fully accessible overbridge.

Station Masters

G.R.H. Mullins 1849 – 1855 (afterwards stationmaster at Boston)
William Ruxton ca. 1863
David Greenwood ???? – 1877
James Bradford 1877 – 1878
Charles Ratchelous 1878 – 1885 
James L. Rayner 1885 – 1892 
George Bolt ca. 1892 – 1896
William Henry Lindsey 1896 – 1915
Thomas Christopher 1915 – 1917 (formerly station master at Hatfield)
Fred Warriner 1917 – 1921
Mr. Trotter 1921 – 1922
George Herbert Gregory 1923 – 1933
E.H. Fowler 1933 – 1937
Edwin Oliver Wright 1937 – 1940
R.P. Haw 1940 
J.E. Fisher ca. 1951

Platforms
The station has nine platforms on three islands. Platforms 1, 3, 4 and 8 can take through trains. Platforms 2 and 5 are south-facing bays; platforms 0, 6 and 7 are north facing bays. A first class lounge is available on platform 3A.

 Platform 0 is used to take almost exclusively Northern Trains services to and from Hull, Beverley and Bridlington. The brand new platform opened on 12 December 2016.
 Platform 1 is used by southbound London North Eastern Railway, Grand Central and Hull Trains services to London King's Cross.
 Platform 2 has no scheduled trains.
 Platform 3A is used by London North Eastern Railway, Grand Central and Hull Trains services to London King's Cross
 Platform 3B is used by Northern Trains services to Sheffield and TransPennine Express services to Manchester Piccadilly
 Between platforms 3 and 4 are the high speed up and down lines to/from London
 Platform 4 is used by northbound London North Eastern Railway services to York, Newcastle and Edinburgh, Grand Central services to Bradford Interchange, Hull Trains services to Hull, Northern Trains through services to Bridlington and Scarborough and TransPennine Express services to Cleethorpes. Southbound CrossCountry services towards Birmingham New Street also use this platform.
 Platform 5 is a bay platform used by East Midlands Railway services to Lincoln and Northern Trains services to Sheffield
 Platform 6 is a bay platform used by Northern Trains services to Leeds.
 Platform 7 is seldom in public use, but is used by Northern Trains services to Scunthorpe when it is.
 Platform 8 is used by northbound London North Eastern Railway services towards Leeds; CrossCountry services to Newcastle; and Northern Trains services in both directions – southbound to Sheffield and northbound to Adwick and Scunthorpe. Services towards Birmingham New Street also use this platform.

There were plans to add platforms 9 and 10 to cope with Eurostar trains but this project was cancelled when it was decided that Eurostar would not serve Britain outside the South East of England.

There are presently no ticket barriers in operation at this station; however, on race days at Doncaster Racecourse, manual ticket checks are in operation in the subway.

The station was refurbished in 2006 and is now directly connected to the Frenchgate Centre extension in Doncaster town centre. The station now has a new booking office for tickets and information, three new lifts, refurbished staircases and subway. There is a newsagent and some food outlets. More recently, interactive touch screens have been installed around the station by London North Eastern Railway services to provide information about local attractions, live departures and disruptions and station facilities. In addition, mobile phone charging points are now available on the concourse, touch screen and self-service ticketing machines have been installed across the concourse; the stairways to the subway have now been divided into two way systems to improve the flow of passengers during peak times.

In a route study by Network Rail, it was proposed that new platforms could be built on the western side of the station to meet expected demand in the future.

In March 2019, it was revealed that there were plans, as part of the East Coast improvement programme in Control Period 6, to add an additional platform at Doncaster.

Accidents and incidents
 On 9 August 1947, a passenger train was in a rear-end collision with another due to a signalman's error. 18 people were killed and 188 were injured.
 On 16 March 1951, a derailment occurred south of the station in which 14 passengers were killed and 12 seriously injured.

Services
Seven train operating companies call at Doncaster, which is the highest number of companies in the UK and is also equal in number only to Crewe, and Edinburgh Waverley in the UK. These operators are the following:

CrossCountry
CrossCountry operates a very limited service. Weekdays see four southbound workings (the first two heading for Banbury, the next to Derby and the final to Birmingham New Street), and four northbound workings (the first three heading for Newcastle, and the final to Leeds). Saturdays see two southbound workings (both for Birmingham New Street) and two northbound workings (both for Newcastle). Sundays sees three southbound workings only (two for Bristol Temple Meads and one for Plymouth).

East Midlands Railway
East Midlands Railway operates a local service to Lincoln and Peterborough from Doncaster. On a weekday, there are currently five northbound workings all starting from Peterborough, there are the same number of southbound services, all heading for Peterborough. On a Saturday there are five northbound services from Peterborough and five southbound services mostly to Peterborough with the first only going as far as Lincoln and the last as far as Sleaford. There is no Sunday service on this route. 

Grand Central
Grand Central operates services between Bradford Interchange and King's Cross. On weekdays and weekends there are four southbound services and four northbound service on this route. GC services on there King's Cross to Sunderland route pass fast through the station but may also call in the event of service disruption.

Hull Trains
Hull Trains operates services between London King's Cross and Hull or Beverley via Selby.

London North Eastern Railway
London North Eastern Railway offers regular (55 trains per day) services to London King's Cross, Leeds, Harrogate, York, Newcastle, Edinburgh and Glasgow Central.

Northern Trains
Northern Trains generally offers services from Doncaster to Sheffield, Leeds and Hull.

TransPennine Express
TransPennine Express operates services eastbound to Cleethorpes, and westbound to Liverpool Lime Street, with some services terminating at or starting from Manchester Piccadilly or Manchester Airport. TransPennine services operate hourly in each direction generally.

See also
Listed buildings in Doncaster (Town Ward)
Joan Croft Halt railway station (North Doncaster Chord project)
Doncaster Works – a locomotive works adjacent to the station.

References

External links

Railway stations in Doncaster
DfT Category B stations
Former Great Northern Railway stations
Railway stations in Great Britain opened in 1848
Railway stations in Great Britain closed in 1850
Railway stations in Great Britain opened in 1850
Railway stations served by CrossCountry
Railway stations served by East Midlands Railway
Railway stations served by Grand Central Railway
Railway stations served by Hull Trains
Railway stations served by London North Eastern Railway
Northern franchise railway stations
Railway stations served by TransPennine Express
Buildings and structures completed in 1938
Grade II listed buildings in South Yorkshire
Grade II listed railway stations